Sinocyclocheilus qujingensis is a species of ray-finned fish in the genus Sinocyclocheilus.

Etymology
Sinocyclocheilus qujingensis gets its name from Quijing City in Yunnan, China.

Characteristics
Sinocyclocheilus qujingensis is a tropical freshwater fish. It is benthopelagic.

Distribution
Sinocyclocheilus qujingensis inhabits the waters of Yunnan, China.

References 

qujingensis
Fish described in 2002